The Michigan Wolverines women's tennis team represents the University of Michigan in National Collegiate Athletics Association (NCAA) Division I competition. College women's tennis became a varsity sport at the University of Michigan in 1973.  Ronni Bernstein has been the head coach since 2007. The team plays its home matches at the University of Michigan Varsity Tennis Center.

See also
Michigan Wolverines men's tennis

References

External links